Tottus is a chain of Chilean hypermarkets that competes with Wong, Metro and Plaza Vea supermarkets in Peru. Tottus also operates stores in Perú.

History
The company was established in 2002, opened its first supermarket in Lima Norte, and was acquired by Chilean retailer Falabella in 2005. The company has twenty-six locations with over a dozen in the Lima Metropolitan Area and others throughout the remainder of the country, as well as in Chile. Tottus has announced plans to further expand within Chile, and into Colombia and Argentina, with as many as forty new locations in 2011. The company follows the supermarket model and currently has 6.5% of market share in Peru. The company's goal is to reach ten percent in 2011.

Notes

External links
Tottus website

Retail companies established in 2002
Supermarkets of Peru
Economy of South America
Falabella (retail store)
2002 establishments in Peru
Supermarkets of Chile